Robert Toombs Dawson (born August 1, 1938) is a senior United States district judge of the United States District Court for the Western District of Arkansas.

Education and career
Born in El Dorado, Arkansas, Dawson received a Bachelor of Arts degree from the University of Arkansas in 1960. He was in the United States Army from 1961 to 1962 and became a first lieutenant in artillery, and in the Arkansas National Guard from 1962 to 1965, where was also a first lieutenant. He received a Bachelor of Laws from the University of Arkansas School of Law in 1965, and was thereafter in private practice in Fort Smith, Arkansas until 1998.

Federal judicial service
On November 7, 1997, Dawson was nominated by President Bill Clinton to a seat on the United States District Court for the Western District of Arkansas vacated by Hugh Franklin Waters. Dawson was confirmed by the United States Senate on April 2, 1998, and received his commission on April 7, 1998. He assumed senior status on August 14, 2009.

References

Sources

1938 births
Living people
20th-century American judges
21st-century American judges
Judges of the United States District Court for the Western District of Arkansas
National Guard (United States) officers
People from El Dorado, Arkansas
United States district court judges appointed by Bill Clinton
University of Arkansas alumni
University of Arkansas School of Law alumni
United States Army officers
Arkansas National Guard personnel